Prescott National Cemetery is a United States National Cemetery located in the city of Prescott, in Yavapai County, Arizona. Administered by the United States Department of Veterans Affairs, it encompasses , and has over 7,500 interments. Beginning in 2020 its new columbaria is accepting new inurnments. It is one of two national cemeteries in Arizona (the other being National Memorial Cemetery of Arizona).

History 
The cemetery was originally established near Fort Whipple in 1864, but was moved to its present location in 1869 after flash flooding washed out many of the grave sites. The majority of gravesites here span from the American Indian Wars to the Vietnam War.

Prescott National Cemetery was placed on the National Register of Historic Places in 1999.

Notable monuments 
 Unknown Soldiers Monument, made of white marble blocks with a cross on top.

Notable interments 
 Medal of Honor recipients
 Nicholas Foran (1844–1927), recipient for action in Arizona Territory during the Indian Wars
 Others
 Jim Russell Pike (1936–2019), vocalist with The Lettermen
 Rufus Danforth (1888–1920), served as Sapper Rufus Davis, World War I soldier of British Royal Engineers, only Commonwealth war grave in the cemetery.

Gallery

References

External links
 National Cemetery Administration
 
 
 
 CWGC: Prescott National Cemetery

Cemeteries in Arizona
Buildings and structures in Prescott, Arizona
Historic American Landscapes Survey in Arizona
United States national cemeteries
Protected areas of Yavapai County, Arizona
1869 establishments in Arizona Territory
Commonwealth War Graves Commission cemeteries in the United States